Llandrillo railway station (ɬandriːɬɔ) in Denbighshire, Wales, was a station on the Ruabon to Barmouth line. It was to have closed to passengers on Monday 18 January 1965 but closed prematurely on 14 December 1964 due to flood damage. The station had a signal box and was a passing place on the single line.

According to the Official Handbook of Stations the following classes of traffic were being handled at this station in 1956: G, P, F, L, H & C and there was a 1-ton crane.

Neighbouring stations

References

Further reading

External links
 Llandrillo station on navigable 1946 O.S. map

Beeching closures in Wales
Railway stations in Great Britain opened in 1866
Railway stations in Great Britain closed in 1964
Disused railway stations in Denbighshire
Former Great Western Railway stations